Tomislav Crnković (17 June 1929 – 17 January 2009) was a Croatian footballer. He was born in Kotor in what was still the Kingdom of Serbs, Croats and Slovenes.

Playing career

Club
As a defender, he played for HAŠK, Metalac and Dinamo Zagreb. Abroad, he later played at Linzer ASK in Austria and Servette Geneva in Switzerland.

With his 439 caps at Dinamo, Crnković was part of their Yugoslav First League-winning club in 1954 and 1958 as well as their Yugoslav Cup - winning team in 1951 and 1960.  Crnković is regarded to be one of Dinamo's greatest defenders of all time.  In 2006, he was also the founder of the Croatian Football Federation.

International
He made his debut for Yugoslavia in a June 1952 friendly match against Norway and earned a total of 51 caps, scoring no goals. He was part of the team that won silver at the 1952 Olympics, and was also a member of Yugoslavia's 1954 and 1958 FIFA World Cup squads. His final international was a May 1960 European Nations' Cup qualifying match away against Portugal.

Managerial career
He also coached Austrian side Simmering.

Personal life
Crnković was a well-known womanizer, and was married at least five times in his life. After his football career ended, Crnković spent a brief time as a journalist and later the owner of a popular restaurant in Zagreb. He also found himself in financial trouble after being involved in a car accident where he was injured.  He insisted to pay money to the other victims of the accident as well which left him nearly bankrupt. Near the end of his life, he was provided for by the Croatian Football Federation.

References

External links
 
Profile at Serbian football federation

1929 births
2009 deaths
People from Kotor
Croats of Montenegro
Association football defenders
Yugoslav footballers
Yugoslavia international footballers
Footballers at the 1952 Summer Olympics
Olympic footballers of Yugoslavia
Olympic silver medalists for Yugoslavia
Olympic medalists in football
Medalists at the 1952 Summer Olympics
1954 FIFA World Cup players
1958 FIFA World Cup players
1960 European Nations' Cup players
GNK Dinamo Zagreb players
LASK players
Servette FC players
Yugoslav First League players
Austrian Football Bundesliga players
Swiss Super League players
Yugoslav expatriate footballers
Expatriate footballers in Austria
Yugoslav expatriate sportspeople in Austria
Expatriate footballers in Switzerland
Yugoslav expatriate sportspeople in Switzerland
Yugoslav football managers
1. Simmeringer SC managers
Yugoslav expatriate football managers
Expatriate football managers in Austria
Franjo Bučar Award winners